The Scorpions' Pass Time Trial is an annual professional road bicycle race for women in Israel.

Winners

See also 
 Scorpions' Pass

References

Cycle races in Israel
Recurring sporting events established in 2016
Women's road bicycle races
Annual sporting events in Israel